Hlanganani, also known as Spelonken, is an amalgamation of various large villages which are situated in the north western portion of the former Tsonga homeland of Gazankulu, South Africa. Hlanganani is situated alongside the R578 road to Giyani and Elim.

The following places are named after Hlanganani: The Hlanganani Regional Court in Waterval township next to Elim Hospital (built in 1983 by the Gazankulu homeland), the Hlanganani Cost Centre at Bungeni and Nkuzana villages (the Hlanganani Cost Centre houses the Department of Water Affairs and the Department of Public Works, before 1994 it was known as Hlanganani Regional Office Department of Works), the Hlanganani Police Station at Tiyani (Magoro), the Elim-Hlanganani old age home in Waterval township next to Elim Hospital, Hlanganani District Pension Office at Bungeni Village, the Hlanganani Taxi Association and the Hlanganani Community Radio.

History

Hlanganani means Come together in Xitsonga and was meant to be a home to the Tsonga speakers during Apartheid South Africa. The idea behind Hlanganani was to unite both the Tsonga and Venda speakers who were separated by the apartheid ideology in 1948 and was used as a resistance against Apartheid rule.

Before the introduction of apartheid in 1948, both the Tsonga and the Venda people lived together peacefully. That peace was disturbed when apartheid was introduced by the National Party after 1948. Apartheid ideology meant that both the Venda and Tsonga speakers had to be permanently separated from each other.

When homelands were introduced during the early 1970s, thousands of VhaVenda people were forcefully removed from Hlanganani villages and were moved to so-called "Venda areas", while thousands of Tsonga people were also forcefully removed from so-called "Venda areas" and were moved to Hlanganani villages. One such group to be moved to Hlanganani villages were the Vukeyas, who were moved to Mbhokota village and Shirley Village, just outside Elim Hospital, previously the Vukeyas used to stay next to Vleifontein, which was later classified as a Venda area.

Another group were removed from so-called "White areas", one such group was the "Mahlahluvani Community" and were dumped at Nwaxinyamani, the other group of Venda speakers who were removed from a "White area", not far from Mahlahluvani community, were dumped at Mashau village, north of Bungeni village.

The Shimange community, which also used to live adjacent Vleifontein, were also forcefully removed and dumped at Shirley Village and Waterval township, which was declared a Tsonga area in terms of the Bantu authorities Act, 1951.

The removal of VhaVenda people from Hlanganani area were also carried out, by the South African police and the South African Army, VhaVenda people were also forcefully removed from villages such as Mbhokota, Shirley, Lemana, Chavani, Nwaxinyamani and Tiyani or Magoro, Magoro was a popular Venda settlement at the bank of the Middle Letaba Dam, the Magoro community was forcefully removed from Magoro village during the 1960s because that area was declared a Tsonga area in terms of the Apartheid planning, the uprooted VhaVenda were dumped at so-called "Venda areas", such as Tshino.

Despite the forced removal, some VhaVenda people, especially the ones staying at Bungeni village, managed to avoid being forcefully removed to Venda areas. Same applied to the Tsonga people, some Tsonga people managed to avoid being forcefully removed from Venda areas, example are the Tsonga people staying at Mashamba village, the Tsonga at Mashamba village were not removed and stayed there until the end of Apartheid. The Venda Tsonga ratio at Mashamba village is 57% Venda and 39% Tsonga, the remaining percent being other language groups.

Apartheid era

The Village of Mbhokota, Bungeni, Chavani, Magoro, Nwaxinyamani and others were used during the 1960s as dumping grounds by  the Apartheid Government for Tsonga people who have either occupied so-called white areas as well as those that stayed in so-called Venda areas. Mbhokota Village, as one of the dumping grounds during Apartheid, was the hardest hit in terms of overcrowding. Between 1960 and 1970, Mbhokota village became overcrowded and there is no more empty land available for the expansion of the village, the only one way of expanding the already overcrowded village is to demarcate residential sites on the slopes of the mountain. Overcrowding at Mbhokota village happened because of apartheid, before 1948, the village of Mbhokota was bigger and included flat land that is today part of Mashamba and Tshivhuyuni villages.

Villages of Hlanganani

Hlanganani is made up of the following villages, Bungeni, Chavani, Nwaxinyamani, Bokisi, Mbhokota, Riverplaats, Shirley, Waterval, Elim, Lemana, Valdezia and Mambedi, Wayeni, Mahatlani, Nkuzana, Majosi, Kurhuleni, Madobi, Makhasa, Nwa-Matatana (Caledon), Ntshuxi, Tiyani (Magoro), Ribungwani, Olifantshoek, Rivala, Blinkwater and Rotterdam. Each of the above villages can be sub-divided into small villages, meaning that there are hundreds of villages in Hlanganani. After the 1994 General election, Hlanganani was divided into two parts, the western part was handed over to Makhado Local Municipality and the southern part was handed over to Greater Letaba Local Municipality.

According to the 2011 census, the largest concentration of Tsonga people in the Hlanganani area are: Njhakanjhaka Tribal Authority  17,000 people, Njhakanjhaka Tribal Authority includes; (Elim, Magangeni, eka-Mabobo, Lemana, Waterval and Shirley). Nkhensani Tribal Authority 18,000 people, Nkhensani Tribal Authority includes; (Mbhokota, Bokisi, Nwaxinyamani, Chavani and Riverplaats). Bungeni Tribal Authority, 25,000 people, Bungeni Tribal Authority includes; Sekhunyani as the first proclaimed village which was known as Mkhathini, Njhakanjhaka A and Njhakanjhaka B, Nwa-Mhandzi, Mahatlani, wayeni, Mtsetweni, Xihambanyisi, Shivambu, Xitaci, Manyunyu, Mobodlongwa, Makhoma, Xikhulu and Nghonyama. Finally Valdezia Community Authority, 8,000 people, Valdezia has been a Community Authority since 1875 and does not belong to any Tribal Authorities in the area, but for cultural and linguistical reasons, it is classified in one group alongside Njhakanjhaka Tribal Authority, Nkhensani Tribal Authority and Bungeni Tribal authority. The population in these three Tribal Authorities contains 80,000 people of the total population of Hlanganani and it is one of the densely populated region in the Elim district of Makhado Local Municipality.

Hlanganani today

Today, Hlanganani is an example of the 'Rainbow nation', it is a proud home of both VhaVenda and the Tsonga people, the cultural and language diversity that was once a feature at Hlanganani area before the introduction of Apartheid is now back, both VhaVenda and the Tsonga people are embracing each other. Throughout Hlanganani, TshiVenda and Xitsonga are widely used in both Government and business transactions, the ideals of a democratic South Africa is a reality in the Hlanganani area because two languages and their cultures have now Come together, hence the name Hlanganani.

References

Populated places in the Makhado Local Municipality